Switzerland competed at the 1992 Winter Olympics in Albertville, France. Nicolas Bochatay, a member of the delegation, was to represent the country in the speed skiing finals, but he was killed in an accident on the morning of the day of the competition he was to compete in.

Medalists

Competitors
The following is the list of number of competitors in the Games.

Alpine skiing

Men

Men's combined

Women

Women's combined

Biathlon

Men

 1 A penalty loop of 150 metres had to be skied per missed target.
 2 One minute added per missed target.

Bobsleigh

Cross-country skiing

Men

 1 Starting delay based on 10 km results. 
 C = Classical style, F = Freestyle

Women

 2 Starting delay based on 5 km results. 
 C = Classical style, F = Freestyle

Women's 4 × 5 km relay

Curling

Curling was a demonstration sport at the 1992 Winter Olympics.

Freestyle skiing

Men

Women

Ice hockey

Group B
Twelve participating teams were placed in two groups. After playing a round-robin, the top four teams in each group advanced to the Medal Round while the last two teams competed in the consolation round for the 9th to 12th places.

Consolation round 9th-12th places

9th-place match

Contestants
Reto Pavoni
Renato Tosio
Samuel Balmer
Sandro Bertaggia
Sven Leuenberger
Patrice Brasey
Doug Honegger
Dino Kessler
Andreas Beutler
André Künzi
Jörg Eberle
Alfred Lüthi
Andreas Ton
Patrick Howald
Gil Montandon
Thomas Vrabec
Mario Brodmann
Mario Rottaris
Keith Fair
Manuele Celio
André Rötheli
Peter Jaks
Head coach: Juhani Tamminen

Nordic combined 

Men's individual

Events:
 normal hill ski jumping 
 15 km cross-country skiing 

Men's Team

Three participants per team.

Events:
 normal hill ski jumping 
 10 km cross-country skiing

Ski jumping 

Men's team large hill

 1 Four teams members performed two jumps each. The best three were counted.

References

Official Olympic Reports
International Olympic Committee results database
 Olympic Winter Games 1992, full results by sports-reference.com

Nations at the 1992 Winter Olympics
1992
1992 in Swiss sport